Kunhsaw Kyaunghpyu (c. 955–1048) was king of Pagan Dynasty of Burma (Myanmar) from 1001 to 1021. He was the father of Anawrahta, the founder of Pagan Empire. The principality of Pagan continued to gain strength during his reign. Pagan's surviving walls were most likely constructed during his reign.

Kunhsaw is part of the pantheon of Burmese nats (spirits) as Htihpyusaung Nat.

Brief
According to the Burmese chronicles, Kunhsaw Kyaunghpyu was a son of an early Pagan king Tannet, who was assassinated as his queen was enseint with Kunhsaw. However Tannet died in the early 10th century. It is more likely that he was a descendant of Tannet. He took over the Pagan throne from King Nyaung-u Sawrahan, and married three of Nyaung-u's chief queens, two of whom were pregnant and subsequently gave birth to Kyiso and Sokkate. Kunhsaw raised Sokkate and Kyiso as his own sons. When the two sons reached manhood, they forced Kunhsaw to abdicate the throne and become a monk. Kyiso took over as king.

He lost the throne in 1021 although various chronicles do not agree on the dates regarding his life and reign. The oldest chronicle Zatadawbon Yazawin is considered to be the most accurate for the Pagan period. The table below lists the dates given by four main chronicles, as well as Hmannan's dates when anchored by the Anawrahta's inscriptionally verified accession date of 1044.

The deposed king remained a monk for over two decades. Then in 1044, Kyiso' successor Sokkate married one of Kunhsaw's queens, mother of Anawrahta, greatly angering Anawrahta. Anawrahta challenged and killed Sokkate in single combat. Anwarahta offered the throne to Kunhsaw. But the former king refused, allowing Anawrahta to ascend the throne. Kunhsaw died four years after his son Anawrahta ascended the throne c. 1048.

Notes

References

Bibliography
 
 
 
 
 
 

Pagan dynasty
11th-century Burmese monarchs